The active bishops of the Church of England are usually either diocesan bishops or suffragan bishops. Several also hold portfolios of national responsibility, as spokesperson bishops for the Church of England and/or as Lords Spiritual in the House of Lords.

Diocesan bishops
As there are 42 dioceses of the Church of England, there are 42 bishops diocesan (including vacancies). Of the 42: both archbishops and the Bishops of London, of Durham and of Winchester, sit in the House of Lords as Lords Spiritual ex officio; a further 21 sit there by seniority (of whom five had their seniority accelerated); the Bishop of Sodor and Man sits ex officio in the Legislative Council of the Isle of Man and also in Tynwald Court; fourteen diocesans are not (yet) Lords Spiritual; and the Bishop in Europe is ineligible for the House of Lords.

Lords Spiritual with ex officio seniority

Lords Spiritual with seniority of service
Until 2015, the 21 longest-serving among the remaining diocesan bishops were eligible to sit in the House of Lords as Lords Spiritual. Since women became eligible as bishops in 2015, female diocesan bishops take precedence over male ones whenever a new vacancy in the Lords arises, in accordance with the Lords Spiritual (Women) Act 2015 (in force until 17 May 2025).

Other diocesan bishops

Acting diocesan bishops
Acting diocesan bishops, properly called episcopal commissaries, are referred to by a wide variety of informal titles. For simplicity, this article refers only to the Acting Bishop of Somewhere.

Suffragan bishops
, there are 73 bishops suffragan, plus the Archbishops' Bishop (who is neither diocesan nor suffragan, but the incumbent has not been a diocesan). Of the 73: the Bishop of Dover acts as if a diocesan bishop, the Bishop of Islington has a national role (though often focused in London), five bishops provide Alternative Episcopal Oversight (to parishes who reject the presbyteral and/or episcopal ministry of women), 20 are area bishops, and the remaining 46 are deployed in suffragan roles across their diocese.

Other bishops
, there are twelve people in active ministry (i.e. not retired) in the Church of England who are in episcopal orders but not in episcopal posts.
Jonathan Ruhumuliza, former Bishop of Cameroon (Church of the Province of West Africa) and of Kigali (Anglican Church of Rwanda; consecrated 1991), has been in parish ministry in England since 2005
David Conner, former Bishop of Lynn (consecrated 1994), has been Dean of Windsor since 1998
Pete Broadbent, former Bishop of Willesden (consecrated 2001), has been Bishop's Adviser (2030 Vision) in the Diocese of London since 1 October 2021.
Humphrey Southern, former Bishop of Repton (consecrated 2007) has been Principal of Ripon College Cuddesdon since 2015
Anthony Poggo, former Bishop of Kajo-Keji (Episcopal Church of South Sudan; consecrated 2007), has been based at Lambeth Palace since 2016: as the Archbishop of Canterbury's Advisor on Anglican Communion Affairs until 2022 and as Secretary General of the Anglican Consultative Council since
Mark Sowerby, former Bishop of Horsham (consecrated 2009), has been Principal of the College of the Resurrection, Mirfield, since 2019
Mark Rylands, former Bishop of Shrewsbury (consecrated 2009), has been a parish priest in Devon since 2018
Chris Goldsmith, former Bishop of St Germans (consecrated 2013), has been based at Church House, Westminster as national Director of Ministry since 2019
Rob Gillion, former Bishop of Riverina (Anglican Church of Australia; consecrated 2014), has been Vicar of Streatham Christ Church and Associate Bishop for the Arts in the Diocese of Southwark since 2020
Graham Tomlin, former area Bishop of Kensington (consecrated 2015), has been leading the Centre for Cultural Witness since 2022
Jan McFarlane, former Bishop of Repton (consecrated 2016), has been a Canon Residentiary of Lichfield Cathedral since 2020
Jo Bailey Wells, former Bishop of Dorking (consecrated 2016), has been "Bishop for Episcopal Ministry" at the Anglican Communion Office since January 2023.

House of Bishops
The membership of the General Synod's House of Bishops is:
All 42 bishops diocesan (or as many as are in post)
The Bishop suffragan of Dover (as a quasi-diocesan bishop; Rose Hudson-Wilkin, since 2019) and the Bishop to the Forces (Hugh Nelson, Bishop suffragan of St Germans; since 2021)
9 bishops suffragan (5 from Canterbury province; 4 from York) elected by and from among all the bishops suffragan.
The following have been elected to serve in the Convocations for 2021–2026:
Philip North, Bishop suffragan of Burnley, Bishop-designate of Blackburn and Acting Bishop of Blackburn (since 2018)
Ric Thorpe, Bishop suffragan of Islington (since 2021)
Karowei Dorgu, area Bishop of Woolwich (since 2021)
Bev Mason, Bishop suffragan of Warrington (since 2021)
Olivia Graham, area Bishop of Reading (since 2021)
Martin Gorick, Bishop suffragan of Dudley (since 2021)
Jill Duff, Bishop suffragan of Lancaster (since 2022)
One southern vacancy, vice Perumbalath
One northern vacancy, vice Hartley

Acting diocesan bishops (commissaries) also attend but do not vote (unless they happen to hold a vote as an elected representative suffragan) at meetings of the House.

The four "provincial episcopal visitors" (the Bishops suffragan of Richborough, of Ebbsfleet, of Oswestry and of Beverley) may attend and speak, but are not members and may not vote — unless they are elected as representative suffragans.

It was announced in June 2016 that the "participant observers" arrangement would be replaced from 1 December 2016 with an arrangement whereby six female bishops suffragan would be "[given] rights of attendance". They are:
Alison White, Bishop suffragan of Hull
Ruth Worsley, Bishop suffragan of Taunton
Anne Hollinghurst, Bishop suffragan of Aston and Acting Bishop of Birmingham
Karen Gorham, Bishop suffragan of Sherborne
one vacancy vice Hartley
one vacancy vice Bailey Wells

Scheduled Crown Nominations Committee (CNC) meetings

The following meetings of the Crown Nominations Commission have been held since 2020, with the outcomes listed:

See also
List of deans in the Church of England
List of archdeacons in the Church of England
List of Church of England dioceses
Members of the House of Lords
Religion in the United Kingdom

Consecration notes

Resignations and retirements

Notes

References

External links
Current list of Lords Spiritual (select "Party and Group" and "Bishops")
Peter Owen – Suffragan Bishops in the Church of England

Anglican episcopal offices
 
Christianity and politics
Spiritual peers
Church of England bishops